Villeneuve-sur-Yonne is a commune in the Yonne department in Bourgogne-Franche-Comté in north-central France.

It is surrounded by a partly intact wall, built during the 12th century, which was one of the 8 residences of the French kings.

Geography
The city lies on the bank of the river Yonne, between the cities of Sens and Joigny.

History
The city was founded in 1163 by Louis VII of France to protect the kingdom of France at the boundary of the Champagne. In 1204 King Philip II Augustus held parliament in the city, and Louis IX resided in the city before departing for the Eighth Crusade. In 1594 the city was burnt down. During the French Revolution the name was changed from le-Roi (the king) to sur-Yonne (on the Yonne). In 1870 a memorial for the dead was designed by the sculptor Émile Peynot. The city was governed from 1927 till 1931 by the infamous mayor Marcel Pétiot, who was guillotined in 1946, convicted of 26 killings.

Demography
The inhabitants are called Villeneuviens.

Climate

Main sights

 Two main entrance gates to the city, Gate of Sens and Gate of Joigny. The Gate of Joigny or Porte de Joigny was rebuilt in the 16th century; the Gate of Sens, or Porte de Sens, predates it by three hundred years and is similar in appearance.
 Gothic and Renaissance Church Notre-Dame de l'Assomption (Our Lady of Assumption).
 City market built during the 19th century by Paul Sédille.
 La Lucarne aux Chouettes or The Owls' Nest restaurant which was run by Leslie Caron, serving Burgundy specialities. The old dilapidated boathouse was bought by her in 1990 on the suggestion of Jean Renoir.
 A Neolithic menhir situated on the bank of the river, in the locality called Pierre-Fritte or Plaine-des-Egriselles.

Sister and twin cities
  Horní Bříza, Czech Republic
   Braubach am Rhein, Germany
  Collingham, United Kingdom

See also
Communes of the Yonne department

References

External links

 City Website
 Villeneuve-sur-Yonne at INSEE website

Communes of Yonne
1163 establishments in Europe
1160s establishments in France
Champagne (province)